Zejmen is a village and a former municipality in the Lezhë County, northwestern Albania. At the 2015 local government reform it became a subdivision of the municipality Lezhë. The population at the 2011 census was 5,660.

Demographic history
Zejmen (Zojmen) is recorded in the Ottoman defter of 1467 as a village in the timar of Abdullah in the vilayet of Dimitri Gjonima. The settlement had a total of five households represented by the following household heads: Gjergj Gjika, Gjon Sujma, Domenik Hajmili, Progon Nizha, and Dimitri Dromshi.

References

Former municipalities in Lezhë County
Administrative units of Lezhë
Villages in Lezhë County